This is a list of women writers who were born in Slovakia or whose writings are closely associated with that country.

B
Jaroslava Blažková (1933–2017), novelist, short story writer, children's writer, journalist

F
Margita Figuli (1909–1995), novelist, children's writer, translator

H

 Maša Haľamová (1908–1995), modernist poet

Mila Haugová (born 1942), Hungarian-born Slovak poet, literary critic, editor, translator

J
Vilma Jamnická (1906–2008), actress, astrological writer

L
Anna Lacková-Zora (1899–1988), poet, novelist, short story writer
Katarína Lazarová (1914 –1995), novelist, translator
Ľuba Lesná (born 1954), journalist, novelist, playwright

P
Hana Ponická (1922–2007), dissident writer, playwright

R

Kristína Royová (1860–1936), widely translated novelist, poet, children's writer

T
Timrava, pen name of Božena Slančíková (1867–1951), poet, novelist, short story writer, playwright

Z
Hana Zelinová (1914–2004), novelist, short story writer, playwright
Zuzka Zguriška (1900–1984), novelist, playwright, translator

See also
List of Slovak authors
List of women writers

References

-
Slovak
Writers
Writers, women